Mission Santa Gertrudis (Spanish: Misión Santa Gertrudis), originally to be called Dolores del Norte, was a Spanish mission established by the Jesuit missionary Georg Retz in 1752 in what is today the Mexican state of Baja California.

History

The future mission site was discovered by the missionary-explorer Fernando Consag, and work at the site was begun a year before the formal founding of the mission. Consag's sponsors for establishing this mission were the Marquis de Villapuente and his wife Dona Gertrudis de la Peña after whom the mission was named. 

Assisted by Andrés Comanji, Consag discovered a spring as well as ancient rock paintings a mere three kilometers from the site of the mission. He enlisted the aid of the Cochimi to transport water from the spring of Santa Gertrudis and used it to establish vineyards for sacramental wine production. These vines became the basis for the contemporary vineyards of Baja California.

Architecture

The architecture of the mission is reminiscent of the medieval styles of the country of origin of Retz, with carved stone. The beautiful church doors are flanked by finely decorated obelisk style columns.

The mission was finally abandoned in 1822. The church was extensively renovated in 1997, substantially altering its historical character.

References

 Vernon, Edward W. 2002. Las Misiones Antiguas: The Spanish Missions of Baja California, 1683-1855. Viejo Press, Santa Barbara, California.
 Kier, David. 2016. Baja California Land of Missions
M&E BOOKS, El Cajon, California.

See also
 Spanish missions in California
 List of Jesuit sites

Gertrudis
Landmarks in Ensenada
Jesuit missions
1751 establishments in New Spain